Maira is a genus of robber flies in the family Asilidae. There are at least 50 described species in Maira.

Species
These 57 species belong to the genus Maira:

 Maira abscissa (Walker, 1860) c g
 Maira aenea (Fabricius, 1805) c g
 Maira albifacies Wulp, 1872 c g
 Maira appendiculata Bezzi, 1928 c g
 Maira aterrima Hermann, 1914 c g
 Maira auribarbis (Macquart, 1848) c
 Maira aurifacies (Macquart, 1848) c
 Maira bicolor Joseph & Parui, 1987 c g
 Maira bisnigra Bigot, 1878 c g
 Maira calopogon (Bigot, 1878) c g
 Maira cambodgiensis Bigot, 1878 c g
 Maira claripennis (Le Guillou, 1842) c g
 Maira compta Walker, 1862 c g
 Maira condecora (Walker, 1862) c g
 Maira conveniens (Walker, 1861) c g
 Maira delfinadoi Joseph & Parui, 1981 c g
 Maira elegans (Walker, 1855) c g
 Maira elysiaca Osten Sacken, 1881 c g
 Maira flagellata (Walker, 1862) c g
 Maira germana (Walker, 1858) c g
 Maira gloriosa (Walker, 1858) c g
 Maira gracilicornis Meijere, 1914 c g
 Maira hirta Meijere, 1913 c g
 Maira hispidella Wulp, 1872 c g
 Maira indiana Joseph & Parui, 1987 c g
 Maira kollari (Doleschall, 1857) c g
 Maira lauta Wulp, 1885 c g
 Maira leei (Paramonov, 1958) c g
 Maira limbidorsum Bezzi, 1928 c g
 Maira longicornis Meijere, 1913 c g
 Maira longirostrata Bromley, 1935 c g
 Maira nieifacies (Macquart, 1850) c g
 Maira nigrithorax Wulp, 1872 c g
 Maira nigropilosa Meijere, 1913 c g
 Maira niveifacies (Macquart, 1850) c g
 Maira nychthemera Wulp, 1872 c g
 Maira occulta Wulp, 1872 c g
 Maira paradisiaca (Walker, 1859) c g
 Maira paria Bigot, 1878 c g
 Maira placens (Walker, 1859) c g
 Maira pseudoindiana Joseph & Parui, 1995 c g
 Maira requista (Walker, 1859) c g
 Maira setipes (Walker, 1862) c g
 Maira smaragdina Bigot, 1878 c g
 Maira sodalis (Walker, 1858) c g
 Maira splendida (Guerin Meneville, 1831) c g
 Maira superba Meijere, 1913 c g
 Maira tincta Meijere, 1913 c g
 Maira tomentosa Wulp, 1872 c g
 Maira tuberculata Wulp, 1872 c g
 Maira vanderwulpi Meijere, 1913 c g
 Maira varians Ricardo, 1929 c g
 Maira villipes (Doleschall, 1857) c g
 Maira whitneyi Curran, 1936 c g
 Maira willowsi Curran, 1936 c g
 Maira wollastoni Austen, 1915 c g
 Maira xizangensis Shi, 1995 c g

Data sources: i = ITIS, c = Catalogue of Life, g = GBIF, b = Bugguide.net

References

Further reading

External links

 
 

Asilidae genera